The following is a list of notable French Turks, including both original immigrants of full or partial Turkish descent who obtained French citizenship and their French descendants.

Most notable French Turks have come from, or originate from, Turkey but there are also notable French people of Turkish origin who have immigrated from, or descend from, the other former Ottoman territories, especially Turks from the North Africa and the Levant.

Academia

Dr Ipek Yalcin Christmann, neurobiologist in charge of research at the French National Centre for Scientific Research 
Dr Serdar Dalkılıç, founder of the National Union of Hospital Practitioners (SNPAC) and President of the Franco-Turkish Health Foundation 
Erol Gelenbe, Professor of Electrical and Electronic Engineering at Imperial College
Nilüfer Göle, Professor of Sociology at the École des Hautes Études en Sciences Sociales; 
Doğan Kuban, Professor of Ottoman Architecture and History at Istanbul Technical University 
Farouk Mardam-Bey, director of the Arab world collections at the French publishing house Actes Sud (Turkish Syrian origin, from the Mardam Bey family) 
Pınar Selek, sociologist and feminist 
Nora Şeni, Professor of History at the Institut français de géopolitique;  
Semih Vaner, founder and president of the "French Association for the Study of the Eastern Mediterranean and the Turkish-Iranian World" (AFEMOTI), Director of the "Study Group on Contemporary Turkey and Iran (ERTCI)", and Director of "Study notebooks on the Eastern Mediterranean and the Turkish-Iranian world" (CEMOTI).

Arts and literature

Leïla Chellabi, writer (Morocco-born to a Turkish-Algerian father)
Salih Coskun, sculptor and painter
Gürkan Coşkun, painter
Abidin Dino, painter
Ramize Erer, cartoonist and painter
Vénus Khoury-Ghata, poet and writer (Turkish-Lebanese origin) 
Yasmine Ghata writer (Turkish-Lebanese origin)
Nedim Gürsel, novelist who teaches contemporary Turkish literature at the Sorbonne 
Mahir Guven, novelist (Turkish mother) 
Mustapha Haciane, writer (Turkish-Algerian origin)
Uğur Hüküm, journalist 
Reha Hutin, American-born journalist and President of the 30 millions d'amis foundation 
Seyhan Kurt, poet, writer, anthropologist and sociologist 
Amin Maalouf, author (Lebanese-born to a Turkish-Egyptian mother)
Nihal Martli, painter
Kenizé Mourad, novelist who descends from the exiled Ottoman royal family
Yaman Okur, dancer
Mourad Salem, artist (Turkish-Tunisian origin)
Fikret Mualla Saygı, painter
Leïla Sebbar, writer (Turkish-Algerian through her grandmother) 
Elif Shafak, novelist who was awarded the Ordre des Arts et des Lettres in 2010
Nil Yalter, contemporary feminist artist (Turkish-Egyptian origin)

Business
Ali Bourequat, businessman (Moroccan-born to a Turkish-Tunisian father)
Emad Khashoggi, businessman who initiated the Château Louis XIV development project (Lebanese-born into the Saudi-Turkish Khashoggi family) 
Gökşin Sipahioğlu, photographer who founded the Paris-based photo agency Sipa Press
Selçuk Yilmaz, businessman and co-owner of the French clothing brand Naf Naf
Seyfi Yılmaz, businessman and co-owner of the French clothing brand Naf Naf

Fashion and design
Ayşe Ege, co-founded the Paris-based high fashion brand Dice Kayek 
Ece Ege, co-founded the Paris-based high fashion brand Dice Kayek
Ali Suna, model and creator of the brand Divercityz  
Yasemin Tordjman, fashion stylist and former wife of Éric Besson (Turkish-Tunisian through her paternal grandfather)

Film and television

Isabelle Adjani, actress (Turkish-Algerian father)
Muratt Atik, actor
Anaïs Baydemir weather presenter on France 2 and France 3
Ergün Demir, actor
Cansel Elçin, actor
Deniz Gamze Ergüven, film director
Ramin Matin, film director

Music

Armande Altaï, singer (Turkish mother from Syria) 
Deniz Arman Gelenbe, pianist and Professor at the Trinity Laban Conservatoire of Music and Dance
Gülseren, singer who represented Turkey at the Eurovision Song Contest 2005
Anil Eraslan, cellist 
Mennel Ibtissem, singer and former contestant on The Voice France (Turkish-Syrian father)
Yilmaz Karaman (Lil maaz), rapper
MRC, rapper
Faik Sardag, musician
Anne Sila, singer 
Serâ Tokay, first conductor of Turkish origin to give a concert at the Carnegie Hall 
Master Turc, singer

Politics 

Chérif Sid Cara, politician and doctor (Turkish-Algerian  origin)
Nafissa Sid Cara, the first female minister to serve in the French Fifth Republic as well as the first ever Muslim woman to serve as a minister in a French government (Turkish-Algerian  origin) 
Agnès Evren, elected as a Member of the European Parliament in the 2019 election in France, 
Mourad Kaouah, served as the deputy of Algiers from 1958 to 1962 (Turkish-Algerian origin) 
Kaddour Sator, Deputy of Constantine in 1946 (Turkish-Algerian origin) 
Metin Yavuz, elected mayor of Valenton in 2020

Religion
Ahmet Ogras,  the first French-Turk to become President of the French Council of the Muslim Faith in 2017

Sports

Patrick Abada, pole vaulter and Olympian (Turkish-Algerian origin)
Emre Akbaba, football player 
Aksel Aktas, football player 
Osman Aktas, boxer
Kubilay Aktaş, football player 
Mikail Albayrak, football player
Selen Altunkulak, female football player  
Fatih Atik, football player 
Numan Bostan, football player 
Lucie Bouthors, female basketball player (Turkish mother) 
Umut Bozok, football player 
Ozkan Cetiner, football player 
İbrahim Dağaşan. football player
Mustafa Durak, football player 
Mevlüt Erdinç, football player 
Ayhan Güçlü, football player
Metehan Güçlü, football player 
Ender Günlü, football player 
Serdar Gürler, football player 
Selim Ilgaz, football player 
Burak Kardeş, football player 
İpek Kaya, female football player
Samed Kılıç, football player 
Özer Özdemir, football player 
Sinan Özkan, football player 
Hakan Özmert, football player 
Fatih Öztürk, football player 
Yusuf Sari, football player 
Benjamin Stambouli, football player (Turkish-Algerian through his great-grandfather) 
Henri Stambouli, football player (Turkish-Algerian through his grandfather)
Servan Taştan, football player
Atila Turan, football player 
Kendal Ucar, football player 
Sabahattin Usta, football player 
Serkan Yanık  football player

Other
Prince Mukarram Jah, French-born Head of the House of Nizam of Hyderabad (Turkish mother) 
Princess Niloufer, Ottoman princess 
Marie Tepe, vivandière who fought for the Union army during the American Civil War

See also 
Turks in France
List of French people

References

French people of Turkish descent
French
Turkish
Turkish French people